Caizi is a town in Longxi County, Gansu province, China. , it administers the following 18 villages:
Caizi Village
Nanshilipu Village
Nan'ershilipu Village
Banyang Village
Qianhe Village
Dongfeng Village
Mouhe Village
Xianfeng Village
Houjiamen Village
Dongjiasi Village
Majiazhuang Village
Jiuzhuang Village
Baihua Village
Xueshan Village
Sidian Village
Zhongchuan Village
Yuange Village
Buyun Village

References

Township-level divisions of Gansu
Longxi County